Smart or STPL (Smart Telecom Private limited) is a private mobile network service provider of Nepal. The company was established on 1 July 2008. It has been extending its network with an aim of having coverage of the entire of Nepal. On 28 October 2017 the company launched its 4G services in Kathmandu, Lalitpur, Bhaktapur and Pokhara, and is planning to launch 4G in other parts of Nepal soon.It is the third largest telecommunication company in Nepal.

Coverage 
Being a new company of telecommunications, they’ve increased the scope and efficiency of their network to serve their customers even better with 4G 4G Lite And 2G services across 45 districts out of 75 in Nepal. Expanding their 4G network to all together 19 districts in Nepal, it is now currently available in Kathmandu, Lalitpur, Bhaktapur, Kavre, Kaski, Nawalparasi, Banke, Dang, Kailali, Bardiya, Kanchanpur, Parsa, Dhanusa, Chitwan, Saptari, Siraha, Morang, Jhapa & Sunsari. Whereas, 2G is available in 26 districts; Ramechhap, Sindupalchowk, Sindhuli, Dolakha, Nuwakot, Dhading, Syangja, Parbat, Baglung, Palpa, Gulmi, Gorkha, Lamjung, Tanahun, Rupandehi, Kapilvastu, Achham, Bajura, Doti, Baitadi, Bajhang, Bara, Sarlahi, Rautahat, Mahottari & Makwanpur.

Aim 
As per SMART Telecom, it will continue to focus on the investment in a network to offer quality services, good internet speed and coverage to their customers. And it aims to increase  its coverage towards whole nation in a better way with a slogan of 'Your World Your Voice'.

References

External links
Official Website

Telecommunications companies of Nepal
2008 establishments in Nepal